Westpoint Harbor is a marina that opened in 2008 at the mouth of the Westpoint Slough located in Redwood City, California.

History
The first development on the site in the 19th century had been a shipbuilding yard with close proximity to a cement factory. After 1918, when the cement plant closed, Leslie Salt used the site as a holding pond for bittern.

The marina took over 19 years from when the idea was conceived originally to being construction being completed. Three years were spent obtaining the land from the owner Cargill who owns several nearby salt ponds. An additional 12 years passed obtaining permits from various agencies to commence construction which took another four years due to heavy rains.

Private commuter ferry service carries passengers from the East Bay and San Francisco to the marina, with a planned expansion for more public service in the future.

Recreational use

Westpoint Harbor also hosts the Stanford University Treeathalon every year, a triathlon competition.

Gallery

See also

Port of Redwood City
San Francisco Bay
Greco Island

References

Further reading
Westpoint article in Latitudes 38
Westpoint article in Windward Ho!

External links

 

Marinas in California
Redwood City, California
Ports and harbors in the San Francisco Bay Area
2008 establishments in California